Lawrence Alexander Wilson (June 14, 1863 – March 3, 1934) was a Quebec business, philanthropic and political figure. He was prominent in the Coteau-du-Lac, Quebec and the Soulanges region.

The Wilson family came from Aberdeen, Scotland and settled in Lower Canada in the nineteenth century. Lawrence Alexander Wilson was born in Montreal, Lower Canada. From 1889 to 1921 he built up a business as a wholesale wine and liquor merchant.

In 1906, he founded the Quebec Land Company, a property development firm.

He entered politics in the 1920s and was elected to the House of Commons of Canada in the 1925 federal election as the Liberal MP for Vaudreuil—Soulanges and was re-elected in 1926 federal election. Wilson resigned his seat in February 1929 intending to retire from politics but was persuaded to run in the by-election to succeed himself and was returned to the House of Commons in July 1929.

Wilson was appointed to the Senate of Canada by William Lyon Mackenzie King in June 1930 and died in office four years later.

In 1923, Wilson donated part of his property to the town of Coteau-du-Lac for the creation of a park and $5,000 to construct a pavilion which was named after him.

Wilson's brother-in-law was Quebec legislator Maurice Perrault.

References

External links

1863 births
1934 deaths
Members of the House of Commons of Canada from Quebec
Liberal Party of Canada MPs
Liberal Party of Canada senators
Canadian senators from Quebec